Pamela Z (born 1956) is an American composer, performer, and media artist who is best known for her solo works for voice with electronic processing. In performance, she combines various vocal sounds including operatic bel canto, experimental extended techniques and spoken word, with samples and sounds generated by manipulating found objects. Z's musical aesthetic is one of sonic accretion, and she typically processes her voice in real time through the software program Max on a MacBook Pro as a means of layering, looping, and altering her live vocal sound. Her performance work often includes video projections and special controllers with sensors that allow her to use physical gestures to manipulate the sound and projected media.

Biography
Born in Buffalo, New York, and raised in the Denver Metro area, Pamela Z received her bachelor's degree in music from the University of Colorado at Boulder (1978), where she studied classical voice. In the late 1970s and early 1980s, she worked as a singer/songwriter on voice and guitar throughout Colorado under the name Pam Brooks. She began experimenting with digital delay and reverb to process her voice in the early 1980s and started composing works involving live looping.

In 1984 she relocated to San Francisco where she legally changed her last name to Z and became active in the San Francisco Bay Area contemporary music and performance art scene. Throughout the late 1980s and the 90s, she continued to create solo voice and electronics performances, and gained visibility through her appearances in Bay Area new music performance venues, theaters, and art galleries. She began touring her work nationally and internationally and, by the year 2000, she was performing regularly in New York, Europe, and Japan.
Z has performed in such festivals as Bang on a Can at Lincoln Center in New York, the Interlink Festival in Japan, Other Minds in San Francisco, La Biennale di Venezia in Venice, Italy, and Pina Bausch Tanztheater's Festival in Wuppertal, Germany.

In addition to her solo voice and electronics works, Z has composed chamber works commissioned by contemporary music soloists and ensembles such as Kronos Quartet, the Bang on a Can All Stars, Eighth Blackbird, flautist Claire Chase, the New York string quartet ETHEL, Del Sol Quartet, The California EAR Unit, the San Francisco Contemporary Music Players, the Left Coast Chamber Ensemble, and Orchestra of St. Luke's. She has also composed scores for modern dance choreographers including Stephan Koplowitz, Brenda Way (ODC Dance), Jo Kreiter (Flyaway Productions), and Mary Armentrout. In addition, she has composed and recorded film scores for independent filmmakers including Barbara Hammer, Lynne Sachs, Jeanne C. Finley and John Muse.

Recordings
Studio Recordings of several of Pamela Z's signature pieces appear on her 2004 solo CD, A Delay is Better on the Starkland label. In addition, a number of her works have been released on various experimental music and sound art compilations including her "Declaratives In First Person" on Crosstalk: American Speech Music a 2008 (Bridge Records) compilation produced by Mendi + Keith Obadike, and ‘’Geekspeak’’, which appears both on Sonic Circuits IV, a 1996 Innova Recordings compilation and on Bitstreams, a Whitney Museum collection of works from a 2001 sound exhibition curated by Stephen Vitiello. Z also recorded a track for Meredith Monk’s 2012 tribute CD Monk Mix– performing a voice and electronics arrangement of Monk’s ‘’Scared Song’’.

Other work
Pamela Z has created fixed-media sound works for radio and new media installations for art galleries. She has had solo exhibitions at fine arts institutions including the Krannert Art Museum (Champaign, Il), Savvy Contemporary (Berlin), Trondheim Elektroniske Kunstsenter (Trondheim, Norway), the Fine Arts Center Galleries at Bowling Green State University, and the Chico University Art Gallery (Chico, CA), and her installations have been shown in group exhibitions including Dak’Art (Dakar Biennale, Sénégal), Bitstreams (Whitney Museum of American Art), side by side/in the world (San Francisco Arts Commission Gallery, Walkmen (Erzbischöfliches Diözesanmuseum, Cologne, Germany) and the McColl Center for Visual Art, Charlotte, NC.

Z is also known for her narration work in independent film and television. Her voice appears in several documentaries including Sam Green's The Weather Underground (2002), Hrabba Gunnarsdottir's Alive in Limbo, and the Bay Area PBS affiliate KQED's weekly arts television program Spark.

Honors and awards
Z has received numerous awards including the United States Artists fellowship (2020), the American Academy of Arts and Letters Walter Hinrichsen Award (2020), the Rome Prize (2019), the Guggenheim Fellowship (2004); Doris Duke Performing Artist Award in theater (2015); the CalArts Alpert Award in the Arts (1998); the Creative Capital Fund (2002); the ASCAP Music Award (2000-2017); the MAP Fund (2009 and 2012); a SEAMUS Lifetime Achievement Award (2016), and the NEA and Japan/US Friendship Commission Fellowship (1998). In 2008 she was honored as Alumna of the Year by the University of Colorado at Boulder College of Music, and she received a Prix Ars Electronica honorable mention (Linz, Austria) in the Digital Musics Category. In 2017, she was a Robert Rauschenberg Foundation Artist in Residence.

Discography
 Echolocation, (solo album) (1987) ZED, CS 
 Pearls, the Gem of the Sea on " Komotion International Vol. 11", compilation, (1991) Spirit Records, LP, CD, CS 
 State on "State of the Union", (compilation produced by Elliott Sharp), (1992) Arrest, CD AR003
 In Tymes of Olde (Z) and Obsession, Additiction and the Aristotelian Curve (Z and Imhoff) on "From A to Z" compilation, (1993) Starkland, CD ST-203
 Bald Boyfriend performed by The Qube Chix on "Dice" compilation, (1993) Ishtar, CD 001
 Geekspeak on "Sonic Circuits IV" compilation, (1996) Innova Recordings, CD 113
 Parts and Questions/Trip on "Dice 2" compilation, (1996) Ishtar, CD 002
 Caught on "Emergency Music" compilation, (1998) CRI, CD-770 
 Geekspeak on "Bitstreams", compilation curated by Stephen Vitiello, (2001) Whitney Museum of American Art, CD 
 50 for Charles Amirkhanian on "Homo Sonorus" compilation, (2001) Kunstradio, CD
 No. 3 on "Visions", compilation, (2002) EMIT Series, CD 
 A Delay is Better, (solo album) (2004) Starkland, CD ST-213
 Live/Work on "IMMERSION" compilation, (2000) Starkland, 5.1 surround DVD-audio ST-2010
 Peter Kowald Movements I, II, & III (Kowald, Gottschalk, and Z) on "Global Village Trio", (2004) Free Elephant, CD -001
 Pop Titles 'You''' on "Deep Wireless 2: New Adventures in Sound Art", (2005) CD 
John Cage Postcard From Heaven, (Victoria Jordanova: harps, Pamela Z: voices), (2006) Arpaviva, CD -001
 Ethel Ethel Dreams of Temporal Disturbances (Z) on "Light", (2006) Cantaloupe, CD CA20137
 Still Life with Commentator with Vijay Iyer and Mike Ladd (2007) Savoy Jazz
Lisle Ellis Sucker Punch Requiem (Lisle Ellis: bass, Pamela Z: voice & electronics, Oliver Lake: saxophones, George Lewis: trombone, Holly Hoffman: flutes, Mike Wofford: piano, Susie Ibarra: drums & percussion), (2008) Henceforth, CD 616892911227
 Declaratives In First Person on "Crosstalk: American Speech Music" compilation produced by Mendi & Keith Obadike, (2008) Bridge Records, CD 9285
 Meredith Monk Scared Song (composed: Meredith Monk, arr. & performed: Z) on "Monk Mix", (2012) House Foundation for the Arts, CD
 Holding It Down: The Veterans' Dreams Project (2013) (Vijay Iyer & Mike Ladd)

Bibliography
 Gann, Kyle American Music in the Twentieth Century (Schirmer Books, 1997) , p. 383
 Borger, Irene. (1999). “The Force of Curiosity” (Interview with Pamela Z). California Institute of the Arts. pp. 299–323.
Harris, Craig, ed. (1999). “Art and Innovation” (Michael Black, David Levy, and Pamela Z "Artscience Sciencart") The MIT Press, Cambridge, MA/London, England. . pp. 210–247
Wilson, Stephen. (2002). Information Arts: Intersections of Art, Science, and Technology (Gesture: Pamela Z). MIT Press, Cambridge MA/ London, England. . pp. 745–746
Bulatov, Dmitry, ed. (2001). Homo Sonorus An International Anthology of Sound Poetry . (Pamela Z, USA) The National Center for Contemporary Art, Kaliningrad Branch, Russia.
Malloy, Judy, ed. (2003). Women in New Media. (Pamela Z: “A Tool is a Tool”) MIT Press, Cambridge MA/London England. . pp. 343–361
Gray, Herman S. (2004). Cultural Moves: African Americans and the Politics of Representation. American Crossroads. .
Rothenberg, David. (2005).  Why Birds Sing . Basic Books. . pp. 203–204
 Uitti, Francis-Marie. “Pamela Z”, Contemporary Music Review: IMPROVISATION , Routledge (Taylor & Francis), Edinburgh Vol. 25, Nos 5/6 (October/December 2006), pp. 587–589.
 Lewis, George. “The Virtual Discourses of Pamela Z ”  Journal of the Society for American Music , Cambridge University Press, Cambridge MA, Vol. 1, No. 1, (February 2007), pp. 57–77.
Lane, Cathy (2008).  Playing with Words, The spoken word in artistic practice. CRISAP, RGAP Distributed in the U.K. and Europe by Cornerhouse Publications. , pages 34–36
Rodgers, Tara. (2010). Pink Noises: Women on Electronic Music and Sound (Pamela Z, Language, Machines, Embodiment) Duke University Press Books, .
Garrett, Charles Hiroshi, ed. (2013).  The Grove Dictionary of American Music  (Pamela Z). Oxford University Press. .
Kelly, Jennifer. (2013).  In Her Own Words: Conversations with Composers in the United States . University of Illinois Press, Urbana, Chicago, and Springfield. . pp. 210–227
Raines, Robert. (2015).  Composition in the Digital World: Conversations with 21st Century American Composers . Oxford University Press, New York, NY. . pp. 306–316
Da Rin, Renate (author), Parker, William (author/editor). (2015).  giving birth to sound - women in creative music . Buddy's Knife, Köln, Germany. . pp. 271–280
 Rutherford-Johnson, Tim (author). (2017).  Music after the Fall: Modern Composition and Culture since 1989 . Simpson Imprint in Humanities-University of California Press, Oakland, CA. .
 Chiriacò, Gianpaolo. (2018). Voci Neri. Mimesis/Eterotopie, Sesto San Giovanni, MI. . pp. 195–201
 Voegelin, Salomé. (2018). Fragments of Listening: The Political Possibility of Sound. Bloomsbury Academic, London, UK. .
 Gaston-Bird, Leslie. (2020). Women in Audio''. Routledge, New York, NY. . pp. 131–135

External links

 official Pamela Z website
 From A to Z compilation CD
 Crosstalk: American Speech Music compilation CD
 surround sound recording of Live/Work, commissioned by Starkland
 A Delay Is Better on Bandcamp

Sources

1956 births
20th-century American composers
20th-century American women singers
20th-century American singers
20th-century classical composers
20th-century women composers
21st-century American composers
21st-century American women singers
21st-century American singers
21st-century classical composers
21st-century women composers
African-American classical composers
American classical composers
African-American women classical composers
20th-century African-American women singers
American contemporary classical composers
American electronic musicians
American women classical composers
American women in electronic music
Avant-garde singers
Classical musicians from New York (state)
Contemporary classical music performers
Electroacoustic music composers
Living people
Musicians from Buffalo, New York
University of Colorado Boulder alumni
Singers from Denver
Women in classical music
21st-century African-American women singers